The battle of Dharmat was fought during the Mughal War of Succession (1658–1659) by Aurangzeb against Jaswant Singh Rathore who was allied with the Mughal prince Dara Shikoh. The battle was fought on the open plain of Dharmat on the hot Summer day of 15th April 1658 in which Aurangzeb won a decisive victory due to advantage in artillery and tactics.

Background
On 6th September 1657, Emperor Shah Jahan suddenly fell ill due to strangury and constipation. He failed to hold Jharokha Darshan and the shops were closed in the bazaars around Delhi. There were rumours rife whether the emperor was dead or held hostage by his son Dara . Only some physicians, Dara and his sister Jahanara were physically allowed to see him. The stage was set for the transition of power. Even though Shah Jahan was able to recover completely from his illness, it would still prove costly for him. Seizing the opportunity to claim the throne, Prince Shah Shuja, who was the viceroy of Bengal and Orissa rebelled against his father and prince Murad Baksh crowned himself as emperor at Surat. However, as a contrast to both Shuja and Murad, Aurangzeb did not take the irrevocable step of crowning himself. Instead, he engaged in a busy secret correspondence with Murad, and, to a lesser extent, with Shuja. Letters written in cipher encased in bamboo tubes passed from runner to runner over special relay posts newly established between Ahmadabad and Aurangabad. Both of them agreed to a joint action against their brothers. As a result, they decided to divide the ruling Mughal land amongst themselves.(But this wasn't so as Aurangzeb was only seeking his brother's support for claiming the throne for himself and he would later execute Murad, typical of the Mughal fratricidal wars for the throne).

On February 5, 1658, Aurengzeb left Aurangabad to contest the Mughal Throne. He proclaimed himself ruler and bestowed titles on his children. By April 3 he crossed the Narmada river towards Ujjain. On April 13 he learns that Murad was just near him and Aurangzeb summoned him to come fast and on the next day they camped at Dharmat by the western bank of the Gambhira River.

Preparation
The Imperial forces under Raja Jaswant Singh of Marwar had reached Malwa at the orders of Dara Shikoh by February 1658 but the Raja was still in the dark about the movements of Aurangzeb. At first his army blocked Karchraud near Ujjain to give battle to Murad but Murad avoided battle by prudently taking a detour around Karchraud and joined Aurangzeb. When the Raja realised that Aurangzeb was already in Malwa, he was at his wit's end. Aurangzeb sent a Brahmin envoy, Kavi Rai to advise him to desist from battle and allow him to go Delhi to just see his father. Jaswant tried to parley with Aurangzeb as he thought that the enormous strength of the imperial forces was enough to dissuade both princes. He thought that they will stop their rebellion and return to their domains.

If they declined to listen, they were to be stopped by force. Truly in this case Jaswant Singh was caught between a rock and a hard place. Jadunath Sarkar aptly summarises the dilemma faced by Jaswant Singh in his words:
At all times, a subject opposing two princes of the blood, a servant fighting for a distant master against two chiefs who acknowledge no higher authority than their own will, is severely handicapped. In Jaswant's case the natural inferiority of his position was aggravated by the commands he had received from Shah Jahan—Jadunath Sarkar 

Moreover, his army, too, was an ill-knit group of discordant elements. The various Rajput clans were often divided from each other by hereditary feuds and quarrels about dignity and precedence. Unlike Jai Singh, Jaswant was not the commander to humour and manage them, and make all obey the will of one common head. Then, again, there was the standing aloofness between Hindus and Musalmans. It had been found next to impossible to brigade these creeds together for a campaign under one general.

Many contemporaries blame Jaswant Singh for being inept and inexperienced. He chose his ground badly and so cramped his men that the horsemen could not manoeuvre freely nor gather momentum for a charge; The ground where Jaswant took his stand was narrow and uneven, with ditches and swamps on its flanks. One historian asserts that Jaswant had deliberately poured water on 200 yards of ground in front of him and trodden it into mud, evidently to arrest the enemy's charge. His position was also surrounded by trenches thrown up during the previous day, as the usual precaution against night attacks. In short, the imperial army seemed to be standing on an island, ready for a siege. He failed to send timely succour to the divisions that needed it most, and the battle once begun, he lost control over his forces as if he were a mere divisional leader and not the supreme commander of all. Lastly he made the fatal mistake of despising artillery. It is said that the one of the chiefs under Jaswant, Askarandas advised him to fall on the European gunners who manned the artillery pieces of Aurangzeb in a night raid so as to avoid annihilation of the Rajputs but Jaswant Singh refused as he thought that it was below the dignity of a Rajput to attack the foe when they are unarmed.

Battle

The Charge of the Rajputs
It was a little over two hours from sunrise, on 15th April, 1658, when the rival hosts sighted each other. The battle began with the usual discharge of artillery, rockets, and muskets at long range. The distance gradually decreased, as Aurangzeb's army advanced slowly, keeping its regular formation. The Rajputs were soon engaged in a close hand-to-hand combat. The Rajputs densely packed within their narrow position, were severely galled by the barqandazes and archers of the princes’ army from front and flank, without being able to manoeuvre freely and give an effective reply. Their losses began to mount up every minute. The Rajput leaders of the Van,— Mukund Singh Hada, Ratan Singh Rathor, Dayal Singh Jhala, Arjun Singh Gaur, Sujan Singh Sisodia and others, with their choicest clansmen, galloped forward. Shouting their war- cry of Ram Ram  “they fell on the enemy like tigers, casting away ail plan.” The flood of Rajput charge first burst on Aurangzeb's artillery.
The guns and muskets fired at point-blank range, woefully thinned their ranks, but so impetuous was their onset that it bore down all opposition. Murshid Quli Khan, the Chief of Artillery, was slain after a heroic resistance and his division was shaken; but the guns were not damaged.

For one point of time the Rajput charge was seeming to overwhelm Aurengzeb's vanguard but his van was composed of his most picked troops, “eight thousand mail-clad warriors,” many of them hereditary fighters of the Afghan tribe, and their generals were reliable men. Muhammad Sultan, Najabat Khan, and other commanders of the Van, on their elephants kept their ground like hills, while the flood of Rajput charge raged round and round them in eddies. Here the most stubborn and decisive fighting of the day took place. The close combat was so heavy that  “The ground was dyed crimson with blood like a tulip-bed.”

The Rajputs, being divided into many mutually antagonistic clans, could not charge in one compact mass; they were broken up into six or seven bodies, each under its own chieftain and each choosing its own point of attack. Thus the force of their impact was divided and weakened as soon as it struck the dense mass of Aurangzib's Van.  

The Maharajah had chosen his position so badly that many of the imperialists standing on the uneven ground could not join in the fight, and many others could not charge by reason of their being cramped within a narrow space. Half the imperial Van, viz., the Mughal troops under Qasim Khan, rendered no aid to their Rajput comrades now struggling hard with Aurangzeb's Van, they were suspected of collusion with the enemy or of antipathy to the Rajputs. The charge of Jaswant's vanguard was not followed up. Aurangzeb's troops, who had parted before the rushing tide, closed again behind them, and thus cut off their retreat. Jaswant, too, was not the cool wise commander to keep watch on all the field and send reinforcements and the new development made his position untenable.

Heavy losses for the Rajputs
By this time the watchful eye of Aurangzib had taken note of the situation his advanced reserve had been pushed up to reinforce the van, and he himself moved forward with the centre to form a wall of support and refuge close behind them. Above all, Shaikh Mir and Saf Shikan Khan with the right and left wings of the centre struck the Rajputs in the waist from the two flanks, while they were engaged with Aurangzib's van in front.

Without support or reinforcement arriving from their own army, the Rajputs were disheartened and checked. Mukund Singh Hada, their gallant leader, received an arrow through his eye and fell down dead. All the six Rajput chieftains engaged in the charge were slain. Hopelessly outnumbered now, assailed in front, right, and left, and cut off from their rear, the Rajputs were slaughtered. Aurangzeb's gunners, with their pieces mounted on high ground, concentrated their fire on the enemy's centre under Jaswant himself. At the sight of the annihilation of their brave vanguard and a triumphant forward movement on the part of Aurangzeb, desertion appeared in the Maharajah's ranks. Kai Singh Sisodia from the right flank of the Centre, and Sujan Singh Bundela and Amar Singh Chandrawat from the van, left the battlefield with their clansmen and returned home.

Even though the imperialists were close to defeat, there stood 2,000 Rathors under the banner of Marwar, ready to live or to die with their chieftain, besides many other Rajput and Mughal auxiliaries; and they offered a stubborn opposition. Iftikhar Khan, who bravely fought the reserves with his depleted forces, was slain.

With the Vanguard of Iftikhar Khan overwhelmed and the Mughal force under Qasim Khan kept aloof during the battle, Jaswant Singh fought valiantly for 4 hours even though he was wounded, his voice was a constant encouragement to his Rajput troops. According to Ishwardas, he chose the option of charging with his horse towards the strong fresh troops to get slain, but he was persuaded by Maheshdas and Askarandas to desist from it and took the reins of the horse from him.

Last stand of the imperialists
With the retreat of Jaswant Singh from the battlefield, the battle was already lost, however the war was continued by Ratan Singh Rathore and would eventually end after his death. Due to his sacrifice, Ratan Singh was immortalized by the contemporary poets of Rajasthan.

Aftermath

The soldiers had been under arms for more than eight hours of a hot April day. Victor and vanquished alike were worn out by the strife. So, Aurangzeb mercifully forbid pursuit, saying that this sparing of human life was his offering (zakat) to Allah. The Muslim prisoners of Jaswant Singhs army were treated with respect, however the Hindus were all slaughtered, even though Aurangzeb himself had several thousand Hindus fighting for him.

The deserted camp of the imperialists close to the field, contained booty beyond imagination. Hither the victors flocked. The entire camp of Jaswant and Qasim Khan with all their artillery, tents, and elephants, as well as a vast amount of treasure, became the victorious princes'  spoil, while their soldiers looted the property equipment and baggage of the vanquished array. Long strings of camels and mules, laden with various articles, were seized as prize or pillaged by the common soldiers and camp followers.

But the only question that remains is what advantage did Aurangzeb really got from this battle ?. As Historian Jadunath Sarkar comments:

But far greater than all these material gains was the moral prestige secured by Aurangzeb. Dharmat became the omen of his future success in the opinion of his followers and of the people at large throughout the empire. At one blow he had brought Dara down from a position of immense superiority to one of equality with his own, or even lower. The hero of the Deccan wars and the victor of Dharmat faced the world not only without loss but with his military reputation rendered absolutely unrivalled in India.–Jadunath Sarkar 

Followed by the victory at Dharmat, Aurangzeb marched towards Agra, culminating in Battle of Samugarh against Dara.

References

Bibliography
 

History of India
Jaswant Singh
Dharmat